James Burton Serrin  (1 November 1926, Chicago, Illinois – 23 August 2012, Minneapolis, Minnesota) was an American mathematician, and a professor at University of Minnesota.

Life
He received his doctorate from Indiana University in 1951 under the supervision of David Gilbarg.  From 1954 till 1995 he was on the faculty of the University of Minnesota.

Work
He is known for his contributions to continuum mechanics, nonlinear analysis, and partial differential equations.

Awards and honors
He was elected a member of the National Academy of Sciences in 1980.

Selected works
.
.
.

References

External links 

 Donald G. Aronson and Hans F. Weinberger, "James B. Serrin", Biographical Memoirs of the National Academy of Sciences (2016)

See also
American mathematicians

1926 births
2012 deaths
20th-century American mathematicians
21st-century American mathematicians
People from Chicago
Indiana University alumni
University of Minnesota faculty
Members of the United States National Academy of Sciences
PDE theorists
Mathematicians from Illinois
Fluid dynamicists